Pashat is the main town in Salarzai Tehsil, Bajaur District, in the Khyber Pakhtunkhwa province of Pakistan. The population is 5,111 according to the 2017 census.

References 

Populated places in Bajaur District